Trash-O-Madness is a 1992 animated short (which began production in 1991) created by Joe Murray, who, prior to this point, had made several independent animated shorts (including The Chore and My Dog Zero), as well as a MTV ID, and it was the pilot episode for what became Nickelodeon's 4th Nicktoon, Rocko's Modern Life. During the series' first season, a new version of the pilot, that was extended for the purposes of including it as a regular episode, was produced. The new version was paired up "The Good, the Bad, and the Wallaby" as the 10th episode to be produced, and aired as the 6th. In addition, that episode featured an extended end credit sequence to accommodate the names of production crew behind "Trash-O-Madness". On February 7, 2012, the original pilot version found its way onto Shout! Factory's season 2 DVD as a special feature. In Rocko's Modern Life: Spunky's Dangerous Day, the second level is named after this episode.

Plot

Original cut 
The sun rises over O-Town as Earl, a dog who escaped from the science lab wakes up, growling and barking crazily, biting off the lid to the trash can he resides in, and drinks weed-killer, and gazes at a house behind him. In there, someone is sleeping, and their pet dog is fast asleep too. The dog, named Spunky has his stomach rumbling, and the owner jolts awake in fright, as in fact, he's a yellow-colored wallaby named Rocko. He spots his dog's stomach bump, he yawns and tells Spunky that he's "too hungry to dance'. He grabs his family portrait with his mother, father who is angry at his photo bill, his little sibling, his dog and himself. Remarking that they never had a real breakfast since they migrated from Australia. He then daydreams about the breakfast that his mother used to make him, such as toaster waffles on a stick and even he remembers his mom making him Billy Bob's bacon-bums. Spunky even remembers being fed "Heart Valve Bits". Rocko puts on a blue Hawaiian shirt that has purple triangles decorated on it and clips his toenails, all while telling Spunky if he promises not to electrocute himself today, he'll get to buy him a puppy-pooch meal at Barfy's. He puts on his orange shoes and asks Spunky if he'd like that, only to find the mind-dead dog eat his toenail clippings. Suddenly he hears a noise and investigates to see what's going on by looking out the window. A Hill-O-Stench garbage truck crushes someone's car flat. Rocko realizes that it's garbage day, and that the garbage men have never been by for around six months, and figures out that their license has been reinstated. He grabs together a pile of garbage while telling himself that they can't miss the event today, and that they don't know when they'll come around again, and panickingly instructs Spunky to grab all the garbage that he can, and Spunky quickly eats the toenail clippings.

Downstairs, Rocko puts multiple piles of garbage while Earl sneaks around the house while peeking through the windows occasionally. Rocko plugs in his vacuum, the Suck-O-Matic, while Spunky stands in front of the sucking tube. It vacuums up everything in his nose, including screws, nuts, bolts, a small wedge of cheese, and a fish. The poor dog gets sucked up into the tube. Rocko realizes this, and hits reverse on the vacuum, inflating Spunky and bursts toward the ceiling.

In the kitchen, Rocko throws out any garbage in the fridge, such as a bone, a flat plastic-like surface with holes in it, and comes across a container that reads "Buy War Bonds". He opens it, revealing a slime smut ball being what's left in it, disgusting Rocko. He empties the container as the slime ball oozes out. Spunky examines it out of the trash can, and he barks at it. All the thing does is just squirt a black liquid-like substance.

Spunky plays with the ball, but not before being caught by Rocko, and silently instructs the dog to spit that back out into the can. The dog hesitantly tries, not only to realize that it's also sticky, but while running out the window, the garbage men are coming closer. Rocko puts the rest of the trash out onto the now-huge pile of garbage. Spunky digs himself into the pile before Rocko carries it out to the trash-compactor, the Compact-O-Matic, which is in the kitchen. Rocko chooses either large, small, and decides on Chinese Take-Out Box size, and peeks under to see not only has it compacted the garbage, but his dog Spunky at the front as well. He notices the garbage men are getting even closer, and Rocko hurryingly attempts to carry the now-take-out-box-sized garbage out to the front lawn's trash bin, only to be jump-scared by Earl, causing his brain to literally pop out of his skull. He quickly shuts the door, and looks out the peephole. He nervously chips off his fingernails with his teeth.

Atop the roof of his house, Rocko ties the trash and dog to a fishing pole in order to lure Earl into the garbage truck. Earl becomes suspicious of what's going on, and Rocko snickers, calling Earl a big, ferocious dog. He tells Spunky that they're shaking but doesn't realize that Spunky was still compacted into the garbage, and the face that's on the back of the truck eats the trash, escalating the problem and freaking Rocko out, eyes bulging out of his skull and all, within the fact that his beloved pet dog has been crushed. He reels back and Earl follows, and eats the compacted trash cube and Spunky. Rocko lets go of the pole in shock, causing Earl and the pole to plummet to the ground. Rocko turns at the screen, and says that garbage day is a very dangerous day. He heads to the area where Earl is at now, and politely tells him that small dogs and trash are not part of a balanced diet. Before he can say anymore, Earl punches him in the face. He comes back, now less polite and offers him a steak instead. That doesn't work either, as he still gets punched back. Now not taking it anymore, he launches at Earl's face and screws it up, pulling the line from the fishing pole, then wrestles with the tough dog, and socks him straight into the snout. He realizes that what he did was wrong and undoes it by pulling it back out. He remarks that it's good as new, and Earl finally spits the dog and trash out, enraged, and physically abuses the poor wallaby offscreen.

Back inside Rocko, now beaten to a pulp, walks to the kitchen to remove Spunky from the trash and flattens him out like dough, and grabs an air pump to inflate Spunky, and spins him so the dog can at least look at him dead in the eyes. Spunky grins, causing some air to free from his ear.

At bath night, Rocko now cooled down, realizes that in fact they did get the trash out, and that it just scared him. He tells Spunky how much he loves him, saying that he's all the kangaroo boy's got now, and tells him that he'd do anything for him, but not before he notices that Spunky has in fact brought the slime ball that Rocko disposed of earlier with him the entire time, and tells him to get rid of it, before realizing that he didn't mean to throw it away earlier, while Spunky erects his tongue with the slime out and into the water, as Rocko tells him not to, and tries to flee from the bathtub, but fails to do so, as the slime bursts everywhere, causing the poor wallaby to scream in agonizing and excruciating pain.

Edited broadcast 
At 8:00 in the morning, Rocko gets woken up by his grumpy alarm clock. He then tells Spunky about their childhoods in Australia. Then, a Hill-O-Stench Inc. garbage truck passes by. Rocko and Spunky need to bring all of their garbage outside before it's too late. When they try to catch up to the garbage-men, Earl peeks through the window and gets ready to eat the two. when they look in the fridge, they find a box with a green slime-ball inside. When he tries to get rid of the slime, Spunky tries to play with it, but the slime sprays ink on Spunky's face, then he gets it in his mouth. In the new version, Spunky tries to chew on it like bubble gum, but the sludge sprays on Spunky, they chase each other until the slime lands in his food bowl. all of a sudden, the slime grows bigger and bigger until it sprays ink on Rocko's face. Spunky grabs the slime and walks away, but Rocko grabs the slime and puts it in the trash. Spunky climbs in the trash and grabs the slime in his mouth.

Rocko puts the trash in the trash compactor, pushes an "Chinese Take-Out Box Size" button, and Spunky becomes the size of a cube. Rocko opens the door, and Earl appears, Rocko screams and closes the door real hard. He grabs a fishing rod, ties Spunky, and uses it on the roof. Before that, in the new version, Rocko tries to go the back door to escape Earl. Later on, the garbage truck eats Spunky, Rocko is terrified and he tries to get back Spunky, but Earl catches him in his mouth. Rocko replies "Garbage Day is a very dangerous day." to the watcher. Rocko manages to get Spunky back, but he's beaten up by Earl. Rocko and Spunky now shaped like a balloon appear again in a bathtub at night. Rocko finds out that the slime is in Spunky's mouth all the time. Rocko tells him to get rid of it, but the slime grows beyond the size of the house, popping through the windows and other parts of the house.

Production
Joe Murray originally wrote "A Sucker for the Suck-O-Matic" as the pilot episode but the executives decided that Heffer might be "a little too weird for test audiences." Murray, instead of removing Heffer from "A Sucker for the Suck-O-Matic," decided to write "Trash-O-Madness" as the pilot episode.

Murray co-produced the pilot episode with George Maestri, Marty McNamara, and Nick Jennings at Joe Murray Studio in Saratoga, California, United States. McNamara assembled a cadre of animators. Murray animated half of the pilot, and several San Francisco Bay-area animators such as Robert Scull, Maestri, Jennings, and Timothy Björklund animated the other half. Jennings created all of the production backgrounds.

Murray then hired a camera company. Once the plan fell behind schedule, Murray, Nick Jennings, and George Maestri modified a 35 millimeter camera to film during the night. Tom Schott acted as the cameraman. In the daytime the team transported the film via automobile to San Francisco for processing. After viewing the completed portions, the team arrived in Saratoga to continue the production. Murray rented a motel room for team members to take shifts sleeping and showering; Murray, Jennings, Maestri, and Schott took shifts at the motel. Policemen visited the animators on numerous occasions due to noise produced by the studio.

The team completed the film on schedule; the crew later expanded the film to 11 minutes for use in the series. Murray describes the animation of "Trash-O-Madness" as containing "variations in the Rocko models" and "a lot more stretch than usual" in the animation.

Differences between the original pilot and the new version
 The music, sound effects, and some of the voices were completely different, even though Carlos Alazraqui did all the voices in both versions.
 The pilot featured a completely different opening, that began with a photo album, showing Rocko through the years, and then showed clips from the pilot episode, along with sketches of Rocko with Ed and Bev Bighead, and Heffer. The new version, simply began with a generic title card.
 Rocko was originally yellow, but was changed to beige as the toy company that wanted to market plush toys based on him already had a yellow-colored character.
 The original pilot was 8 minutes long. In the new version, roughly a minute and a half worth of footage was added for, as stated above, the purposes of including it as a regular episode. An extended end credit sequence was also created to extend the length of the pilot.

References

American television  series premieres
Rocko's Modern Life
Films directed by Joe Murray
Animated films about kangaroos and wallabies
Animated films about dogs
1992 short films